Quiet Village: The Exotic Sounds of Martin Denny was the eighth album by Martin Denny. Released in the summer of 1959, the monophonic version of the album (LRP 3122) reached No. 21 on the Billboard monophonic album chart in November 1959, and the stereophonic version (LST 7122) reached No. 12 on the magazine's stereophonic album chart in January 1960.

Track listing

Side A
1. "Stranger in Paradise" (George Forrest) – 2:19
2. "Hawaiian War Chant" (Prince Leleiohoku) – 2:14
3. "Coronation" (Les Baxter) – 2:49
4. "Sake Rock" – 1:57
5. "Paradise Found" – 2:28
6. "Firecracker" – 2:26

Side B
1. "Martinique" – 2:53
2. "My Little Grass Shack in Kealakekua, Hawaii Cha Cha Cha" – 1:56
3. "Tune from Rangoon" – 2:58
4. "Happy Talk" (Richard Rodgers, Oscar Hammerstein II) – 2:24
5. "Pagan Love Song" – 2:23
6. "Laura" (David Raksin, Johnny Mercer) – 2:55
7. "Quiet Village – 3:37

Personnel

Musicians/performers
 Martin Denny – piano, celeste, arranger, composer
 Augie Colon – bongos, congas, bird calls
 Julius Wechter – vibes, marimba, percussion
 Harvey Ragsdale – string bass, marimbula
 Raymond Alexander – percussion
 Jose Bethancourt – percussion
 John Frigo – string bass

Other contributors
 Si Waronker – producer
 Ivan Nagy – color photography
 Pate/Francis & Assoc. – cover design
 Sandy Warner – cover model, "the Exotica girl"
 John Sturges – liner notes

Critical reception
Wally George in the Los Angeles Times called the album another of Denny's "slick releases" and noted: "As with the six previous Denny efforts, the music has the charm of the islands or is it, perhaps, the call of the wild? Denny relies almost entirely on percussion instruments to create his illusions, and one of his helpers, August Colon, supplies bird calls. Unless our ears deceive, Mr. Colon has been padding his part.  This is not necessarily a criticism, just an observation: at times you get the feeling you're locked in the Griffith Park bird sanctuary."

Tony Wilds on AllMusic.com gave the album 4.5 stars and called it as "representative of the standard Denny oeuvre: birdcall "Polynesian" exotica, Chinese, and Japanese." Wilds described "Little Grass Shack" as "self parody" with a cha-cha-chá beat "punctuated with an absurd duck call instead of the usual birds."

Philadelphia disc jockey Phil Sheridan rated it as his "album choice" in July 1959, described the album as "another assortment of native sounds and intriguing musical patterns", and called Denny "an innovator of original sounds".

References

1959 albums
Exotica albums
Martin Denny albums
Liberty Records albums
Albums produced by Martin Denny
Albums arranged by Martin Denny